Abdel Nasser Barakat (born 15 May 1974) is a Palestinian football manager, who was an attacking midfielder for Al-Bireh until he retired. He was the head coach on an interim basis for the Palestine national football team for a single match in 2011. He took over the Palestine national football team in May 2015 after guiding the Olympic side for two years.

He has coached several clubs in Palestine and all age groups of the Palestine national team setup. He was the manager of the Palestine national football team and a holder of a UEFA Pro certificate in coaching.

Coaching career 
Barakat started his professional playing career at the age of 17 with Al-Bireh Institute- where he spent several years. During his playing days he was known as the “Bulldozer” for the power and speed he exhibited as a winger. During his playing days, he was a part of the Palestine national team for a period of two years.

Barakat got his start in coaching at an early age when he was offered the role as a youth team coach by his club, Al-Bireh institute. He won 43 titles while coaching at U12, U14, and U16 level. His success convinced the Palestinian Football Association to hand him the responsibility of coaching the U14 national team.

After taking the role of U14 coach with the Palestine national team, Barakat was then given the responsibility of coaching the U17 program at the age of 25. During the AFC U17 Championship qualification campaign, Barakat was the youngest manager at 25 years of age.

Despite his youth he won the accolade of best manager in the competition after leading Palestine to its first ever win at youth level, beating Bahrain 3-2.

He then parlayed that experience into a role with the U19 program eventually taking over the Olympic team set up in 2013. As Olympic Team coach he led Palestine to its best performance at an Asian Games- recording their first ever win in the competition and leading them past the group stage for the first time.

Palestine national football team 
Abdel Nasser Barakat was appointed manager of the Palestine national football team in April 2015, one month before the start of combined qualification campaign for the 2018 FIFA World Cup and the 2019 AFC Asian Cup.

While in the role, Barakat qualified Palestine for the 2019 AFC Asian Cup finals and guided them to their best ever FIFA ranking of 73 (November 2017). In 19 matches with the national team he has recorded 11 wins, 6 draws, and two losses.

He holds the national team record for most consecutive wins (7) and most consecutive matches without a loss (11).

Managerial statistics

References

External links 
https://www.maannews.net/Content.aspx?id=814837
http://www.kooora.com/?player=101833

1976 births
Living people
Palestinian footballers
Association football midfielders
Palestinian football managers
Palestine national football team managers
Place of birth missing (living people)